Justin Sun (Chinese: 孙宇晨; pinyin: Sūn Yǔchén; born July 30, 1990) is a Chinese-born diplomat, cryptocurrency entrepreneur, and business executive. He is best known as the founder of Tron, a blockchain DAO ecosystem, and for high-profile bidding events. Sun is the Permanent Representative of Grenada to the World Trade Organization (WTO) in Geneva.

Early life and education 
Sun was born in 1990. He holds a Bachelor of Arts degree in history from Peking University and a Master of Arts degree in East Asian studies from the University of Pennsylvania.

At University of Pennsylvania Sun became interested in cryptocurrency and invested early in bitcoin. He was a protégé of Alibaba Group founder Jack Ma, studied at Hupan University, a business school in China founded by Ma, where Sun was recognized as the school's first Millennial graduate in 2018. He became the cover figure of Yazhou Zhoukan in 2011, and a Davos Global Shaper in 2014.

Career 
Sun studied at Hupan University and became the cover figure of Yazhou Zhoukan in 2011 and Davos Global Youth Leaders in 2014. In 2015 he was named CNTV's most noteworthy new entrepreneur, and was named in Forbes China 30 Under 30 from 2015 through 2017.

In September 2017 his company Tron held an initial coin offering (ICO) for the TRN token, a few days before the Chinese government banned ICOs. According to The Verge, Sun was aware of the impending ban, and pushed for the sale to occur before the ban could be announced. Shortly afterwards, Sun left China for the United States.

Sun placed the winning $4.6 million bid to have a private meal with Berkshire Hathaway CEO Warren Buffett in June 2019, before canceling it to widespread surprise. The dinner with Buffett eventually occurred in early 2020. Sun met with Buffett, a critic of cryptocurrency, at the Happy Hollow Club in Omaha, Nebraska, on January 23, 2020. Sun was joined by other cryptocurrency executives, including leaders of Litecoin and eToro. At the dinner, Sun gifted Buffett a phone with bitcoin and other cryptocurrencies. The money from the charity auction benefited the Glide Foundation, which Buffett's late wife Susan introduced to Buffett after volunteering there.

On 11 March 2021, Sun was the underbidder on the historic $69M auction at Christie's New York of the Beeple non-fungible token (NFT) collection Everydays: the First 5000 Days.

In October 2021, Sun participated in a $65 million funding round in Animoca.

In December 2021, Sun announced he was the winner of the New Shepard auction with a bid of $28 million to be the first paying passenger to fly on the Blue Origin vehicle in July 2021. He was not able to fly on this July 2021 mission due to a scheduling conflict. However he purchased (supposedly with the $28 million auction bid, which he paid to Blue Origin in 2021) privately a full flight of New Shepard for himself and intends to select five other participants to fly with him into space in late 2022.

In December 2021, Justin Sun retired as a CEO of TRON to become a diplomat for Grenada.

References

External links 
 Justin Sun on Twitter

1990 births
Living people
Peking University alumni
University of Pennsylvania alumni
People associated with cryptocurrency
People from Xining
Chinese expatriates in the United States